Professional Institute of the Public Service of Canada v Northwest Territories (Commissioner), [1990] 2 SCR 367 is a leading Supreme Court of Canada decision on the freedom of association under section 2(d) of the Canadian Charter of Rights and Freedoms ("Charter").

Background
The Professional Institute of the Public Service of Canada ("PIPSC") was the federal bargaining agent for 32 nurses in the Northwest Territories. On September 1, 1986, the federal government transferred authority over health to the territorial government, requiring the nurses to become employees of the territorial government. To form a collective agreement with the territorial government, the territorial Public Service Act required that the bargaining agent be incorporated by the territory.

The PIPSC attempted to become incorporated within the territory in order to collectively bargain on behalf of the nurses. The territory denied the application and stated there was already a sufficient number of incorporated collective bargaining groups.

The PIPSC applied for a declaration to have section 42(1) of the Public Services Act struck down for violation of  freedom of association under section 2(d) of the Charter.

At the Supreme Court of the Northwest Territories, the declaration was allowed, but was overturned on appeal.

The issue before the Supreme Court of Canada was whether section 42(1), which restricted who could engage in collective bargaining, violated section 2(d) of the Charter and whether it was justifiable under section 1.

Reasons of the court
Sopinka J, writing for the majority, held that was no violation of section 2(d). For a law to engage section 2(d), it must have an effect on the existence of the association or an employee's ability to be a member. Sopinka J noted that the activity of collective bargaining itself is not protected by section 2(d), so it would follow that a restriction on which associations were able to collectively bargain was not a violation. There was nothing in the law that would prevent the employees from joining any other collective bargaining group.

External links
 
 case summary from mapleleafweb.com

Canadian Charter of Rights and Freedoms case law
Supreme Court of Canada cases
1990 in Canadian case law